Rumbur (Kalasha: Rukmu) is one of the three Kalasha valleys situated in Chitral District, Khyber Pakhtunkhwa, Pakistan.

References

External links 

Populated places in Chitral District
Kalasha Valleys
Valleys of Khyber Pakhtunkhwa